Hatsarat (also, Atsarat and Pashakend) is a town in the Gegharkunik Province of Armenia. The town contains a small domed church built in 898.

See also 
Gegharkunik Province

References 

Populated places in Gegharkunik Province